Yan Zhiyi (颜之仪) (523–591), courtesy name Zisheng (子升), was a native of Linyi County, Langya Commandery (琅琊郡) (now Shandong Province). He was a minister during the Northern Zhou dynasty and a governor during the Sui dynasty. He died in the winter of 591-592 at the age of 69 (by East Asian reckoning).

Life

During the Northern Zhou Dynasty

After the death of Emperor Xuan, court officials led by Liu Fang (刘昉) and Zheng Yi (郑译) amended the edict containing Emperor Xuan's will, making Yang Jian (the later Emperor Wen of Sui) chancellor and chief counselor for the young Emperor Jing. Yan Zhiyi, knowing that this was not Emperor Xuan's true intentions, refused to join in the plot. Later, after Yang Jian had become chancellor, he asked Yan Zhiyi for the Imperial Seal. Yan replied with a stern expression,"The Seal belongs to the Emperor; why is the Chancellor demanding to possess it?" Yang Jian was so angered by the reply that he ordered Yan to be dragged out and executed. However, remembering Yan's excellent reputation with the people, Yang Jian halted the execution.

During the Sui Dynasty
In 585, Yan Zhitui was made Inspector of Jizhou.

Family
Yan Zhiyi is a member of the Yan clan of Langya (琅琊颜氏), and is a son of Yan Xie (颜协; 498 - 539), son of Yan Jianyuan. Yan Zhiyi had a younger brother, Yan Zhitui.

References 

523 births
591 deaths
Northern Zhou politicians
Sui dynasty politicians